Combined pulmonary fibrosis and emphysema (CPFE), describes a medical syndrome involving both pulmonary fibrosis and emphysema. The combination is most commonly found in male smokers. Pulmonary function tests typically show preserved lung volume with very low transfer factor.


Presentation
CFPE is characterised by shortness of breath, and reduced oxygen concentration (reflecting gas exchange abnormalities). Imaging shows upper-lobe emphysema, and lower-lobe interstitial fibrosis. CFPE is often complicated by pulmonary hypertension, acute lung injury, lung cancer, and coronary artery disease.

Diagnosis
The diagnosis is confirmed with high resolution CT scan.

References

External links 

Lung disorders